Bryce Napier (born August 12, 1999) is an American professional stock car racing driver. He has competed in the NASCAR Camping World Truck Series, driving for Rick Ware Racing, TJL Motorsports and Jennifer Jo Cobb Racing.

Racing career

Early years
Napier started his racing career with go-karts and then moved up to quarter midgets and minicup cars, eventually winning five California minicup championships. Napier was Stockton 99 Speedway's Rookie of the Year in 2014 while driving a late model.

Camping World Truck Series
Napier debuted in the Truck Series in the 2016 Alpha Energy Solutions 250, starting last in the 32 car field and finishing 23rd, six laps down. He had set the June 18 Iowa 200 at Iowa Speedway as his next race, but did not compete in it. Instead, he signed with Premium Motorsports for the summer race at Bristol Motor Speedway. He returned to Premium's No. 49 truck at Phoenix International Raceway.

Napier returned to Martinsville in 2017, this time with TJL Motorsports. An early oil leak dropped him to last. On June 13, 2017, it was announced that Napier would run four races with Jennifer Jo Cobb Racing, including a race at Talladega Superspeedway after he turned 18. In the first race of the agreement, at Gateway Motorsports Park, Napier crashed in qualifying and had to move to JJC Racing's backup, the No. 0. Napier returned at Iowa, this time in the 10, but dropped out early after running the truck under a start and park operation. He did not attempt a race after that during the 2017 season.

Personal life 
He attended Cypress Charter High School in Live Oak, California, but then transferred to Natural Bridges High School in Santa Cruz. His grandfather was an English road racer.

Motorsports career results

NASCAR
(key) (Bold – Pole position awarded by qualifying time. Italics – Pole position earned by points standings or practice time. * – Most laps led.)

Camping World Truck Series

 Season still in progress
 Ineligible for series points

References

External links
 

1999 births
Living people
People from Scotts Valley, California
NASCAR drivers
Racing drivers from California